The Ford House Office Building is one of the five office buildings containing U.S. House of Representatives staff in Washington, D.C., on Capitol Hill. 

The Ford House Office Building is the only House Office Building that is not connected underground to either one of the other office buildings or to the Capitol itself, and the only House Office Building that does not contain offices of members of Congress. Instead, it primarily houses committee staff and other offices, including the Architect of the Capitol, the Congressional Budget Office, and the Commission on Security and Cooperation in Europe.

History
Prior to the construction of the Ford Building, the site was the home to the Bell School and Zion Wesley Chapel. Construction of the building began in 1939 as part of the Works Progress Administration program. It was designed by architects and engineers in the Office of the Supervising Architect of the Public Buildings Administration under Louis A. Simon. The building originally housed the United States Census Bureau from 1940 to 1942. Over the years, it was used by the Federal Bureau of Investigation to house its Latent Print Unit. Thousands of fingerprint records were housed in the building, requiring manual search techniques to find a match. The unit was one of the first to move to the FBI's J. Edgar Hoover Building upon its completion in 1974. Following the FBI's departure, the building was purchased by the Architect of the Capitol and was renamed House Annex-2. In the late 1980s, the Democratic and Republican parties were each permitted to rename a House Annex building. The Republicans, then in the minority, chose to rename House Annex-2 the Ford Building after former President of the United States and House Minority Leader Gerald Ford, while the Democrats chose to rename House Annex-1 the O'Neill House Office Building after former Speaker of the House Tip O'Neill. The building was officially renamed on September 10, 1990.

Citations

External links
Ford House Office Building
Architect of the Capitol
Historical Highlights: The House Vote to Acquire the Ford House Office Building

Congressional office buildings
Ford
Government buildings completed in 1939
Capitol Hill